Khalq was a faction of the People's Democratic Party of Afghanistan (PDPA). Its historical de facto leaders were Nur Muhammad Taraki (1967–1979), Hafizullah Amin (1979) and Sayed Mohammad Gulabzoy (1979–1990). It was also the name of the leftist newspaper produced by the same movement. The Khalq wing was formed in 1967 after the split of the party due to bitter resentment with the rival Parcham faction which had a differing revolutionary strategy.

It was made up primarily of Pashtuns from non-elite classes. Its leaders preferred a mass organization approach and advocated class struggle to overthrow the system to bring about political, economic and social changes. Their Marxism was often a vehicle for tribal resentments, and its policies eventually led to the failure of the government of the Democratic Republic of Afghanistan that was formed as a result of the Saur Revolution in 1978, including radical reforms and brutal dissident crackdowns that encouraged the rebellion of the religious segments present in the Afghan society, which led to the creation of the Mujahideen and, eventually, to the Soviet military intervention in December 1979.

Early political history
The People's Democratic Party of Afghanistan held its First Congress on 1 January 1965. Twenty-seven men gathered at Nur Mohammed Taraki's house in Kabul, elected Taraki PDPA Secretary General, Babrak Karmal as Deputy Secretary General, and chose a five-member Central Committee(or Politburo).

Finally, Hafizullah Amin was the only Khalqi member of the PDPA to be elected to Parliament in 1969.

Khalq – Parcham division of the PDPA
The party was weakened by bitter, and sometimes violent, internal rivalries. The Khalq faction was more tribal, whereas the Parcham had more support among the urban population and middle classes. Especially on the ideological level, Karmal and Taraki differed in their perceptions of Afghanistan's revolutionary potential:
 Taraki believed that revolution could be achieved in the classical Leninist fashion by building a tightly disciplined working-class party.
 Karmal felt that Afghanistan was too undeveloped for a Leninist strategy and that a national democratic front of patriotic and anti-imperialist forces had to be fostered in order to bring the country a step closer to socialist revolution.

The newspaper was highly successful, especially among students. Its first edition sold 20,000 copies, and later editions numbered around 10,000 (there were only six editions altogether).  On 23 May 1966, the authorities closed Khalq on the grounds that it was anti-Islamic, anticonstitutional, and antimonarchical.  Karmal's faction founded Parcham, a weekly magazine that he published between March 1968 and July 1969. Parcham was shut down in June 1969 on the eve of parliamentary elections.

The Republican Revolution of 1973
Khalq was excluded from the new government because of its lack of good political connections and its go-it-alone policy on noncooperation. Taraki did advocate a united front briefly after former Prime Minister Mohammad Daoud Khan's takeover in an attempt to gain places in the government for his followers, but this effort was unsuccessful. The Khalqis claimed to be more leftist and more independent of the Soviet Union than Parcham, but their base of support was not strong among the masses, and much stronger in the military. Because of this, Khalq abandoned his party's traditional emphasis on working-class recruitment and sought to build his own power base within the officer corps. Khalq's influence at Kabul University was also limited.

In 1973 the Khalq faction energetically began to encourage military personnel to join them. Taraki had been in charge of Khalq activity in the military. In 1973 he passed his recruitment duties to Amin. This move was highly successful: by the time of the communist coup, in April 1978, Khalq outnumbered Parcham by a factor of two or three to one. The Moscow-sponsored union of Parcham and Khalq may have been in preparation for his peaceful passage from the scene in the near future. The merger of Parcham and Khalq rapidly became unglued. However, Mir Akbar Khyber, a prominent leftist, was killed by the government and his associates. Although the government issued a statement deploring the assassination, the PDPA leaders feared that Daoud was planning to exterminate them all. In this way, both Khalq and Parcham forgot their internal rivalries and worked to overthrow the government.

On the eve of the communist coup, Hafizullah Amin was the only member of the Central Committee that was not arrested. The police did not send him to immediate imprisonment, as it did with Politburo members of the PDPA on 25 April 1978. He was the last person to be arrested, his imprisonment was postponed for five hours, during which time Amin, without having the authority and while the Politburo members were in prison, instructed the Khalqi army officers to overthrow the government.

The Khalqist Army cells prepared for a massive uprising. On 27 April the Khalqist military leaders began the revolution by proclaiming to the cells in the armed forces that the time for revolution had arrived. Khalqist Colonel Mohammad Aslam Watanjar was the Army commander on the ground during the Coup, and his troops gained control of Kabul. Colonel Abdul Qadir, the leader of the Air Force squadrons, also launched a major attack on the Royal Palace, in the course of which President Mohammad Daoud Khan and most of his family, including women and children, were assassinated.

The Saur Revolution (April 1978 – April 1992)

The Saur Revolution, as the new government labeled its coup d'état (after the month in the Persian calendar in which it occurred), was almost entirely the achievement of the Khalq faction of the PDPA. Khalq's victory was partially due to Daoud's miscalculation that Parcham was the more serious threat. This success gave it effective control over the armed forces, a great advantage over its Parchami rival. During the first months of the revolution, Cabinet membership was split eleven to ten, with Khalq in the majority.

Khalq as Government (April 1978 – December 1979)

Initially, the revolutionary government of Khalq had a period of acceptance from the Afghan populace partly due to its land reform program. However, its mild form of Marxism grew increasingly out of hand by late 1978, and the government became increasingly outspoken, symbolically changing the national flag to a red one.

The initial, moderate, approach to Islam taken by the PDPA was quickly abandoned as the Khalqists sought to consolidate their hold on power. Khalq dominated the Revolutionary Council, which was to serve as the ruling body of the government.  The Khalq leadership ran the country by issuing a series of eight edicts. They suspended all laws except those on civil matters. Another exception was the criminal law of the Daoud period, retained as a repressive instrument. They also embarked on a campaign of radical land reform accompanied by mass repression in the countryside that resulted in the arrest and summary execution of tens of thousands. The Khalqi policy of encouraging the education of girls, for example, aroused deep resentment in the villages. By putting Afghanistan on the revolutionary road, the Khalq wing of the PDPA stirred the countryside into revolt.

PDPA general secretary Nur Mohammad Taraki refused to tolerate any Parchamis in the military and insisted that all officers affiliate with Khalq. By June 1978 an estimated 800 Parchami military personnel were forced to quit the armed forces. Shortly after, the Khalqist wing in the Army, initiated a purge of Parchamis. They accomplished this performing the elimination of the opposition and removal of any restraints posed by the Parchamis. Hafizullah Amin took over as Chairman of the Ministers Council (prime minister) in March 1979, retaining the position of field marshal and becoming vice-president of the Supreme Defence Council. Taraki remained General Secretaries of the People's Democratic Party, Chairmen of the Revolutionary Council and in control of the Army, though now he reportedly devoted a lot of his time at the Royal Palace, which had been renamed the People's Palace. Events also tended to sub-divide the protagonists. The intense rivalry between Taraki and Amin within the Khalq faction heated up. In September 1979, Taraki's followers, with Soviet complicity, had made several attempts on Amin's life. The final attempt backfired. Amin's murder of Taraki divided the Khalqis. Rival military cliques divided the Khalqis further.

In late October, Amin made a military sweep against the insurgents, victoriously driving 40,000 people – mostly non-combatants – across the border into Pakistan. At the end of 1979 there were 400,000 Afghan refugees, mostly in Pakistan. The USSR attempted to temper the Khalqis' radicalism, urging attendance at mosques, inclusion of Parchamis and non-communists in the government, and a halt to the unpopular land reform movement. Most of this advice was ignored. The last Khalq leader, Hafizullah Amin, was assassinated after Soviet intelligence forces took control of the government and installed Babrak Karmal, a Parchami, in his place.

The Parcham Government and Soviet invasion (December 1979 – April 1989)
Khalqi-Parchami differences began to rend the military as Khalqi leaders, fearful that the Parchamis retained their cellular organization within the military, mounted massive purges of Parchamis. Thanks to Amin's efforts in the 1970s, the officer corps consisted largely of Khalqis. The Army was also not immune to antigovernment sentiment. Soldiers began to desert and mutiny. Herat was the site of an uprising in March 1979 in which a portion of the town's military garrison joined. The rebels butchered Soviet citizens as well as Khalqis.

The purging of Parchamis had left the military forces so dominated by Khalqis that the Soviets had no choice but to rely upon Khalqi officers to rebuild the army. Khalq officers and men expressed bitterness over the preferential treatment given their Parcham rivals by the Parcham dominated regime. Disaffected Khalqis often assisted the Mujahideen. Khalqis in the armed forces often accused their Parchami officers of using them as cannon fodder and complained that young Parchami men were exempted from compulsory military service. A show of this was that, in 1980, at the April military parade celebrating the Saur Revolution, many Tank Corps continued to display the Red Flag of Khalq, instead of the new national flag adopted by Babrak Karmal.

There were also further differences within Khalq between the loyalists of Taraki and those of Amin. Asadullah Sarwari and Sayed Mohammad Gulabzoy were part of the pro-Taraki group, calling itself the "principled Khalqis". They clashed heads several times with the government of Karmal.

PDPA-Khalq (1989–present)

Najibullah Administration (1986–1992)
After the 40th Soviet Army left the country, PDPA General Secretary and President Mohammad Najibullah suffered, to a lesser degree, the same disadvantage that Karmal had when he was installed as General Secretary of the PDPA by the Soviets. This fact was shown by the fierceness of the resistance to Najibullah's appointment within the Parcham faction. This split persisted, forcing PDPA leader Najibullah to straddle his politics between whatever Parchami support he could maintain and alliances he could win from the Khalqists.

In December 1989, 127 Khalqist military officers were arrested for an attempted coup. Twenty-seven officers escaped and later showed up at a press conference with Gulbuddin Hekmatyar in Peshawar. Former Minister of Tribal Affairs, Bacha Gul Wafadar and Minister of Civil Aviation Hasan Sharq were among the conspirators. In March 1990, once again the Mujahideen leader Gulbuddin Hekmatyar cooperated in a coup attempt, this time led by the Khalqist Defense minister Shahnawaz Tanai. Tanai was apparently also supported by those important Khalqist who remained in the Politburo, Assadullah Sarwary and Mohammad Gulabzoi, respectively their country's envoys to Aden and Moscow. They were said to have been intimately connected with the coup and with Gen. Tanai. However, Tanai had no direct control of troops inside Kabul. The plot misfired and failed because of faulty communications. Sarwary and Gulabzoi were both expelled immediately from the party.

Afghan Civil War (1992–2001)
At the end, however, the former Khalqists either joined or allied themselves with the Taliban or other Mujahideen warlords after the collapse of President Najibullah's Government in April 1992. A perfect example of this was that, once Kabul was captured, Gulbuddin Hekmatyar gained the support of some Khalqi (and mostly Pashto) hardliners, including the Minister of Internal Affairs Raz Mohammad Paktin and then Defence Minister Mohammad Aslam Watanjar. Another example of this is the fact that Gen. Tanai has (according to western diplomatic sources) acted as an agent for ISI by providing the Taliban a skilled cadre of military officers.

In this way, the Khalqi faction were once again involved in the war, using his pilots to fly the Mig-23 and Sukhoi fighters of what was left of the Afghan Air Force, driving Soviet Tanks and using Soviet Artillery. With no central government and fighting for different groups, Khalq was merely a pawn in the Afghan Civil War between the Afghan Northern Alliance and the Taliban.

Karzai Administration (2002–present)
Other Khalqists had developed fairly close relations with the Hamid Karzai regime after the defeat of the Taliban.
 General Babrak Shinwari, former head of the youth affairs section of the PDPA under Taraki and Amin, who migrated to Peshawar in Pakistan in the winter of 1992. He later helped found the Afghanistan-Pakistan People Friendship Society and was elected member of the Loya Jirga by a council of elders from Nazyan Shinwari area of Nangarhar province.
 Another former Khalqist general who had enjoyed the protection of powerful politicians in the former Afghan government was the former PDPA governor of Kandahar, Nur al-Haq Olumi, who enjoyed the patronage of Marshal Mohammad Qasim Fahim.
 The National Unity Party (Motahed-e Melli Hezb) was established in 2003. In this way, the Khalqi faction of the Homeland Party is once again attempting to participate in Afghan politics. It is now led by former Khalqist General Noorul Haq Uloomi.

Prominent members
 Hafizullah Amin
 Shahnawaz Tanai
 Nur Mohammad Taraki
 Mohammad Aslam Watanjar

References

External links
 A brief description of the Khalqist successful Coup of 1978
 Constitution of the Democratic Republic of Afghanistan – Khalqist Administration
 About the future of the Afghan Khalqi faction

Factions of the People's Democratic Party of Afghanistan
Political party factions

ru:Хальк